The governor-general of the Bahamas is the vice-regal representative of the Bahamian monarch, currently King Charles III, in the Commonwealth of the Bahamas. The governor-general is appointed by the monarch on the recommendation of the prime minister of the Bahamas. The functions of the governor-general include appointing ministers, judges, and ambassadors; giving royal assent to legislation passed by parliament; and issuing writs for election.

In general, the governor-general observes the conventions of the Westminster system and responsible government, maintaining a political neutrality, and has to always act only on the advice of the prime minister. The governor-general also has a ceremonial role: hosting events at the official residenceGovernment House in the capital, Nassauand bestowing honours to individuals and groups who are contributing to the Bahamas and to their communities. When travelling abroad, the governor-general is seen as the representative of the Bahamas and its monarch. The governor-general is supported by a staff headed by the official secretary to the governor-general.

Governors-general are usually appointed for a five-year term of office, though they formally serve "at the monarch's pleasure". Since 28 June 2019, the governor-general has been Sir Cornelius A. Smith.

The office of the governor-general was created on 10 July 1973, when the Bahamas gained independence from the United Kingdom as a sovereign state and an independent constitutional monarchy. Since then, 11 individuals have served as governor-general.

Appointment

The governor-general is formally appointed by the monarch of the Bahamas. When a new governor-general is to be appointed, the current prime minister recommends a name to the monarch, who by convention accepts that recommendation. At the installation ceremony, the new governor-general takes an Oath of Allegiance and Office. These oaths are administered by the Chief Justice of the Bahamas.

The oath for the due execution of the office of governor-general is:

Functions

The Bahamas shares the person of the sovereign equally with 14 other countries in the Commonwealth of Nations. As the sovereign works and resides predominantly outside of Bahamian borders, the governor-general's primary task is to perform the monarch's constitutional duties on his or her behalf. As such, the governor-general carries out his or her functions in the government of the Bahamas on behalf and in the name of the Sovereign.

The governor-general's powers and roles are derive from the Bahamian constitution's Section 32 to 37, which set out certain provisions relating to the governor-general.

Constitutional role

The governor-general is responsible for dissolving parliament and issues writs for new elections. After an election, the governor-general formally requests the leader of the political party which gains the support of a majority in parliament to form a government. the governor-general commissions the prime minister and appoints other ministers after the election.

The governor-general, on the Sovereign's behalf, gives royal assent to laws passed by the Parliament of the Bahamas.

The governor-general acts on the advice of the prime minister, to issue regulations, proclamations under existing laws, to appoint state judges, ambassadors and high commissioners to overseas countries, and other senior government officials.

The governor-general is also responsible for issuing Royal Commissions of Inquiry, and other matters, as required by particular legislation; and authorises many other executive decisions by ministers such as approving treaties with foreign governments.

The governor-general may, in certain circumstances, exercise without—or contrary to—ministerial advice. These are known as the reserve powers, and include:
appointing a prime minister if an election has resulted in a 'hung parliament'.
dismissing the prime minister who has lost the confidence of the parliament.
dismissing any minister acting unlawfully.
refusing to dissolve the House of Representatives despite a request from the prime minister.

Ceremonial role

The governor-general's ceremonial duties include opening new sessions of parliament by delivering the Speech from the Throne, welcoming visiting heads of state, and receiving the credentials of foreign diplomats.

The governor-general also presents honours at investitures to Bahamians for notable service to the community, or for acts of bravery.

Community role

The governor-general provides non-partisan leadership in the community, acting as patron of many charitable, service, sporting and cultural organisations, and attending functions throughout the country.

The governor-general also encourages, articulates and represents those things that unite Bahamians together. In this role, the governor-general:

frequently receives Bahamians on special occasions or celebrations, students of various schools, and visitors from other countries at Government House.
attends church services, religious observances, and charitable, social, and civic events across the country.
accepts patronage of many national, charitable, cultural, educational, sporting and professional organisations.
issues congratulatory messages to Bahamian organisations for special anniversaries and events, such as major national or international conferences, cultural festivals and sporting championships.

Privileges

Through the passage of the National Honours Act 2016, the Bahamas established seven national orders in 2016. The governor-general, serves as the Chancellor of all these orders.

Salary

The governor-general receives an annual salary of 37,000 BSD.

Symbols

The governor-general uses a personal flag, which features a lion passant atop a St. Edward's royal crown with "Commonwealth of the Bahamas" written on a scroll underneath, all on a blue background. It is flown on buildings and other locations in the Bahamas to mark the governor-general's presence.

Residence

Government House in Nassau is the official residence of the governor-general of the Bahamas.

It was built between 1803 and 1806 and has served as the official residence and office of all Bahamian governors-general since independence in 1973.

List of governors-general
Following is a list of people who have served as governor-general of the Bahamas since independence in 1973.

Symbols
 Died in office.

See also
 List of governors of the Bahamas
 List of prime ministers of the Bahamas

References

Georgetown University

Bahamas, List of Governors-General of the
 
Governors-General
1973 establishments in the Bahamas